Chendur is a village in India which is located near to the Mailam Sri Subramania Swamy Temple, Thiruvakkarai Vakkira Kaliamman Temple and Tindivanam town, and is also a part of Villupuram District of Tamil Nadu.

List of schools in Chendur

References

Villages in Viluppuram district